Gelasimus vocans is a species of fiddler crab. It is found across the Indo-Pacific from the Red Sea, Zanzibar and Madagascar to Indonesia and the central Pacific Ocean. Several forms of G. vocans have been recognised, with their authors often granting them the taxonomic rank of full species or subspecies.

Gelasimus vocans was formerly in the genus Uca, but in 2016 it was placed in the genus Gelasimus, a former subgenus of Uca.

References

Ocypodoidea
Crustaceans of the Indian Ocean
Crustaceans of the Pacific Ocean
Crustaceans described in 1758
Taxa named by Carl Linnaeus